Hugall is a surname. Notable people with the surname include:

Charlie Hugall (born 1984), British music producer, songwriter, and mix engineer
Jimmy Hugall (1889–1927), English footballer
John West Hugall ( 1806–1880), British architect

See also
Hugill (surname)